Park Ju-hyun (born October 5, 1994) is a South Korean actress. She debuted in the film The Dude In Me (2019) followed by tvN 's television film Drama Stage Season 3: My Wife's Bed. She gained recognition with her appearance in the drama series A Piece of Your Mind (2020) and starred in her first lead role as Bae Gyu-ri in Netflix original series Extracurricular (2020).

Biography 
Park Ju-hyun was born on 5 October 1994 in Busan, South Korea. She gained an interest in acting after seeing the musical Cats in her first year of high school. She majored in acting at the Korea National University of Arts and appeared in short films and plays as a student; she graduated in July 2020.

Career 
Before debuting as an actress, she appeared in many CF since 2016.
She debuted 2019 in the film The Dude In Me.

In 2020, Park appeared in the television series Zombie Detective as Gong Sun-ji. It aired on KBS2.

Filmography

Film

Television series

Web series

Hosting

Music videos appearances

Discography

Singles

Composition

Awards and nominations

References

External links 
 
 
 
 

Living people
21st-century South Korean actresses
Korea National University of Arts alumni
South Korean television actresses
South Korean film actresses
Actresses from Busan
1994 births
Best New Actress Paeksang Arts Award (television) winners